Sahand is a city in the Central District of Osku County, East Azerbaijan province, Iran. At the 2006 census, its population was 13,610 in 3,922 households, when it was a village. The following census in 2011 counted 24,704 people in 7,342 households, by which time the village had been elevated to the status of a city. The latest census in 2016 showed a population of 82,494 people in 25,802 households.

Sahand is a satellite city located in Osku County. It is designed to accommodate the overflow of the Tabriz metropolitan area's increasing population. The main campus of Sahand University of Technology is located in the southeastern part of the city.

References 

Osku County

Cities in East Azerbaijan Province

Populated places in East Azerbaijan Province

Populated places in Osku County

Planned cities in Iran